Kamalesh K. Sirkar is a Distinguished Professor of Chemical Engineering at New Jersey Institute of Technology (NJIT) in Newark, New Jersey, USA.  He is also the Foundation Professor of'Membrane Separations and Director of the NJIT Center for Membrane Technologies.  He is internationally recognized as an expert in membrane separation technologies.

Education
Sirkar received his B.Tech. from the Indian Institute of Technology at Kharagpur and both his MS and PhD from the University of Illinois at Urbana-Champaign.

Career
Sirkar  was previously a Professor of Chemical Engineering at Stevens Institute of Technology and Indian Institute of Technology at Kanpur prior to arriving at NJIT in 1992.

His accomplishments
Sirkar is the holder of 25 U.S. patents.
He has also authored 156 refereed articles and 18 book chapters, and is a co-editor of the widely used Membrane Handbook.
He is the Editor of the Elsevier series Membrane Science and Technology and an Associate Editor of Separation Science and Technology.
He has served (or is serving) on the editorial boards of the Journal of Membrane Science, Industrial and Engineering Chemistry Research and Separation Science and Technology.

Honors and awards
Sirkar has received numerous honors and awards throughout his research life.  Some of these include: 
 Kirkpatrick Award (1991).
 Honorary Fellow of  Indian Institute of Chemical Engineers (2001).
 American Institute of Chemical Engineers's Institute Award for excellence in Industrial Gases Technology (2005).
 Thomas Alva Edison Patent Award in the Environmental Category of the Research and Development Council (2006).
 Fellow of American Association for the Advancement of Science (AAAS) in 2008.
 Clarence Gerhold Award of the Separations Division of AIChE (2008).
 NJIT Excellence in Research Prize & Medal (2009).
 New Jersey Inventors Hall of Fame Innovators Award (2009).

References

External links
'NJIT : Experts Database - For the Media -- Kamalesh Sirkar'

Year of birth missing (living people)
Living people
Indian emigrants to the United States
Stevens Institute of Technology faculty
University of Illinois Urbana-Champaign alumni
New Jersey Institute of Technology
IIT Kharagpur alumni